Leea indica, the bandicoot berry, is a large shrub in the family Vitaceae. It is seen as common undergrowth in secondary and disturbed evergreen forests in Indomalaya, Indochina, Australia and Pacific Islands and throughout in the Western Ghats of India.

In religion
In India, stem of bandicoot berry is used in post-funeral rituals of Hindus.

References

External links
 
 
 Details and places where seen

indica
Flora of China
Flora of tropical Asia
Plants described in 1768
Taxa named by Nicolaas Laurens Burman